Rhea Mills is an unincorporated farming community in Collin County, Texas, United States. It is located at the junction of Farm-to-Market Road 2478 and Farm-to-Market Road 1461.

Population
Through 1990, the population of the community was never reported at more than 100, and from 1940 through 1990 it was estimated at just under fifty. In 2000 the population was forty-seven.

History
When brothers William A and James C Rhea built a flour and corn mill near the site, the town became established. Its spelling became the present Rhea Mills in late 1892 after having its name changed from the original Rhea's Mills. In 1876, a post office was established and remained active until it closed in late 1907 and the mail ran thereafter through McKinney in Collin County. Rhea Mills served as a trade and supply center for area farmers for most of its history. The southwest corner of the intersection of FM 2478 and FM 1461 is now within the town limits of Prosper, Texas.

References

External links 
 TopoQuest
 TX HomeTownLocator
 Roadside Thoughts

Unincorporated communities in Collin County, Texas
Unincorporated communities in Texas